Chrysolopus is a genus of weevils in the family Curculionidae ("true weevils").

Species

References 

Cyclominae